Professor Patrick Francis Chinnery, FRCP, FRCPath, FMedSci, is a neurologist, clinician scientist, and Wellcome Trust Principal Research Fellow based in the Medical Research Council Mitochondrial Biology Unit and the University of Cambridge, where he is also Professor of Neurology and Head of the Department of Clinical Neurosciences.

His national roles include being Clinical Director of the UK Medical Research Council, and Co-chair of the National Institute for Health Research BioResource for Translational Research in Chronic and Rare Diseases.

Early life and education 
Chinnery attended Medical School at Newcastle University, where he graduated with a Bachelor of Medical Science degree in 1989 with first class honours; and Bachelor of Medicine, Bachelor of Surgery with honours in 1992. He went on to complete his PhD in mitochondrial genetics in 2000 whilst training in clinical neurology and neurogenetics.

Medical career and research 
Chinnery trained as a physician and neurologist in the north east of England, becoming a member of the Royal College of Physicians in 1995, and completing his specialist clinical training in neurology 2002 when he was appointed Honorary Consultant Neurologist at Newcastle upon Tyne Hospitals NHS Foundation Trust. He specialises in inherited disorders of the nervous system (neurogenetics) and established the north of England regional neurogenetics service between 2002 and 2015.

In 2015 he moved to the University of Cambridge as Professor of Neurology and Head of the Department of Clinical Neurosciences within the School of Clinical Medicine. He practices as a neurologist at Addenbrooke’s Hospital. He became a Fellow of Gonville and Caius College in 2017 where he is Director of Studies in Clinical Medicine.

Chinnery’s research focusses on understanding the role of mitochondria in human disease. He has identified the genetic basis of several new diseases caused by genetic mutations affecting the genetic code within mitochondria (mtDNA) and the nuclear genome which code for mitochondrial proteins. In the first genetic epidemiology study he showed that mtDNA diseases were much more common than expected. People with mtDNA diseases often harbour a mixture of normal and abnormal mtDNA (heteroplasmy). His group showed that most healthy people also carry heteroplasmic mtDNA mutations, but at very low levels. They showed that a dramatic reduction in mtDNA levels within female germ cells during embryonic development leads to major shifts in heteroplasmy levels over one generation (the mitochondrial genetic bottleneck). The bottleneck explains how low level heteroplasmy in carriers can lead to mitochondrial diseases within one generation, and the different severity of mtDNA disease seen in siblings within the same family. Carrying out the first large-scale study in the UK 100,000 genomes project, he showed that the nuclear genetic background also influences the inheritance pattern of mtDNA mutations. He also showed that genetic variation of mtDNA influences the risk of developing common diseases and many human physiological traits, including kidney and liver function.

Throughout his career Chinnery harnessed genetics and genomics to deliver a fast, comprehensive diagnosis for families, and led the pivotal multi-national clinical trial delivering the first licensed treatment for mitochondrial disease 

He has been supported by Wellcome Trust research fellowships since 1995, most recently as a Wellcome Principal Research Fellow. Additional research support has come from the Medical Research Council / UK Research and Innovation, and the National Institute for Health Research.

Leadership 
Chinnery was Director of the National Institute for Health Research (NIHR) Newcastle Biomedical Research Centre from 2008 to 2015, leading a doubling of funding. Since 2012 he has been co-chair of the NIHR Rare Diseases Translational Research Collaboration, then the NIHR BioResource with John Bradley.

In 2010 he was appointed Director of the Institute of Genetic Medicine at Newcastle University. In 2015 he moved to the University of Cambridge as Professor of Neurology and Head of the Department of Clinical Neurosciences.

In 2018 Chinnery became Clinical Director of the Medical Research Council within UK Research and Innovation, where is he responsible for clinical translational research programmes.

He has advised to two UK Government Chief Medical Advisors, and ministers and Secretaries of State within the Department of Health and Social Care and the Department of Business Energy and Industrial Strategy.  In 2020 he was appointed National Core Study Lead for COVID-19 therapeutics by the UK Government Chief Scientific Advisor Sir Patrick Vallance. In 2020 he was asked by UK Government Chief Medical Advisor Professor Chris Whitty to established and chair the UK COVID-19 Therapeutics Advisory Panel (UK-CTAP) which recommended drugs into the UK national clinical trial platforms.

Awards and honours 
Chinnery was awarded several prizes as a training neurologist and researcher, twice being awarded the Charles Symonds Prize by the Association of British Neurologists (1997, 2002). In 2009 he was the youngest elected member of the Academy of Medical Sciences, who awarded him the Foulkes Foundation Medal in 2011.  He has been a Fellow of the Royal College of Physicians since 2006, and a Fellow of the Royal College of Pathologists since 2007. In 2010 he became a NIHR Senior Investigator (now emeritus), and is a corresponding member of the American Neurological Association. In 2022 he was awarded the Galen Medal by the Worshipful Society of Apothecaries.

Personal life 
Chinnery is married to Rachel Chinnery (m.1991) with 4 children: 3 daughters and one son. He also has 1 labrador named Ralph.

References 

British neurologists
Professors of the University of Cambridge
Alumni of Newcastle University
Fellows of the Academy of Medical Sciences (United Kingdom)
Fellows of the Royal College of Physicians
NIHR Senior Investigators
Medical doctors from Leeds
1968 births
Living people